A prohibited airspace is an area (volume) of airspace within which flight of aircraft is not allowed, usually due to security concerns. It is one of many types of special use airspace designations and is depicted on aeronautical charts with the letter "P" followed by a serial number. It differs from restricted airspace in that entry is typically forbidden at all times from all aircraft and is not subject to clearance from ATC or the airspace's controlling body.

According to the U.S. Federal Aviation Administration (FAA): "Prohibited areas contain airspace of defined dimensions identified by an area on the surface of the earth within which the flight of aircraft is prohibited. Such areas are established for security or other reasons associated with the national welfare. These areas are published in the Federal Register and are depicted on aeronautical charts."

Some prohibited airspace may be supplemented via NOTAMs. For example, Prohibited Area 40 (P-40) and Restricted Area 4009 (R4009)  often have additional restricted airspace added via a NOTAM when the President of the United States visits Camp David in Maryland, while normally the airspace outside of P-40 and R4009 is not prohibited/restricted.

Violating prohibited airspace established for national security purposes may result in military interception and/or the possibility of an attack upon the violating aircraft, or if this is avoided then large fines and jail time are often incurred. Aircraft violating or about to violate prohibited airspace are often warned beforehand on 121.5 MHz, the emergency frequency for aircraft.

List of prohibited airspaces
:

Australia
 Australia currently has no prohibited airspaces. Previously, The Pine Gap Joint Defence Facility near Alice Springs was designated as a permanent no-fly zone. This airspace has since been changed to a restricted area (RA3).

China 
 Tiananmen Square
 Any airlines overflying China from Europe to Taiwan with the exception of British Airways, KLM and Air France.

Cuba
 Unscheduled foreign aircraft are prohibited from entering or encroaching Cuban airspace including disputed international water zones except when permission has been explicitly given by the Cuban Government. The Cuban military has been known to shoot down and destroy unauthorised aircraft without warning including a 1996 incident in which two U.S.-registered aircraft were shot down and destroyed by Cuban Air Force MiGs.

Finland
 Loviisa Nuclear Power Plant, Loviisa
Olkiluoto Nuclear Power Plant, Eurajoki
Kilpilahti oil refinery, Porvoo
Munkkiniemi, Helsinki
Kruununhaka, Helsinki
Meilahti, Helsinki
Luonnonmaa, Naantali
Hanhikivi Nuclear Power Plant, Pyhäjoki

France
 All traffic is prohibited above Paris. Authorisations are either given by the Ministry of Defence, for military aircraft, or by the Paris Police Prefecture and the Directorate General for Civil Aviation for civil ones. Moreover, the flying of helicopters within the limits of Paris (designated the Boulevard Périphérique) is also forbidden. Special authorisation can be granted by the Prefecture of Police for helicopters undertaking precise missions such as police air-surveillance, air ambulances but also transport of high-profile personalities.
 Although not within Paris boundaries, the business district of La Défense has been placed under prohibited airspace in response to 9/11.

Greece
All traffic is prohibited above the Parthenon below . This includes aircraft departing from Eleftherios Venizelos International Airport.

Hungary
Budapest (Inner city and Buda Hills)
Hungarian Parliament Building, including the heavily protected Holy Crown of Hungary
Buda Castle, including Sándor Palace (home to the president and his family)
Hungarian National Bank HQ
Hungarian National Museum
Saint Stephen's Basilica, including the heavily protected Holy Right, the right hand of Saint Stephen (the founder of Hungary)
Atomic bunker F4
Research reactor of the MTA Central Physical Research Institute in Buda Hills
Paks (area around Paks Nuclear Power Plant)
Bases of the Hungarian Homeland Defence Forces through the country (including Kecskemét Air Base, Pápa Air Base, Szolnok Air Base)
National parks and holiday resorts (including Lake Balaton and Hortobágy National Park)

India

 The Rashtrapati Bhavan in Delhi.
 Parliament Building, Prime Minister's residence, and other important centres in New Delhi.
 The airspace around many Defence and Indian Air Force bases are restricted, although new proposals are suggesting opening them for civilian aircraft.
 Tirumala Venkateswara Temple in Tirupati state of Andhra Pradesh.
 Padmanabhaswamy Temple in Thiruvananthapuram district state of Kerala.
 The Taj Mahal, Agra, State of Uttar Pradesh, India
 The Tower of Silence, Mumbai.
 Mathura Refinery
 Bhabha Atomic Research Centre
 Sriharikota Space Station in  Nellore district state of Andhra Pradesh.
 A 10-km radius no-fly zone over Kalpakkam nuclear installation, Tamil Nadu.
 Golden Temple in Amritsar, Punjab, India

Ireland
Portlaoise Prison
Limerick Prison
Curragh Camp
Phoenix Park 
Mountjoy Prison

Israel
 Negev Nuclear Research Center
 Sdot Micha Airbase
 Al-Aqsa Mosque

Due to Arab–Israeli conflict, Israeli aircraft are not allowed to fly over numerous countries. These include:
 Iran
 Lebanon
 Syria
 Iraq
 Pakistan
 Libya
 Tunisia
 Malaysia
 Indonesia
 Yemen
 Algeria
 Mali
 Niger
 Mauritania
 Bangladesh

Pakistan
 Islamabad – The no-fly zone is specifically along Constitution Avenue in North-east Islamabad, where many important government buildings are located:
 The Parliament Building
 The Presidency (Residence of the President)
 The Prime Minister's Residence
 The Prime Minister's Secretariat
 The Supreme Court
 Kahuta Research Laboratories, Pakistan's main facility for the development of nuclear weapons
 Khushab Nuclear Complex

Peru
 Machu Picchu

Russia
City of Moscow. Many flights are being regularly routed through the outer regions of this airspace.

Since October 25, 2015, Ukrainian aircraft have been prohibited from entering Russian airspace.

After the Western countries banned Russian planes from its skies following the Russian invasion of Ukraine, aircraft registered in or operated by the Australia, Canada, Japan, New Zealand, Singapore, South Korea, Taiwan, United Kingdom, United States, Norway, Iceland, Switzerland and the European Union member states are banned from using Russian airspace.

On October 30, 2022, Cathay Pacific announced that it would resume using Russian airspace on some flights such as the "polar route" from New York to Hong Kong, which had stopped following the Russian invasion of Ukraine.

Due to the Russian invasion of Ukraine, Russian aircraft are not allowed to fly over numerous countries. These include: 
 Andorra
 Australia
 Canada
 European Union
 Austria
 Belgium
 Croatia
 Czech Republic
 Denmark
 Estonia
 Finland
 France
 Germany
 Greece
 Hungary
 Ireland
 Italy
 Latvia
 Lithuania
 Luxembourg
 Malta
 Netherlands
 Poland
 Portugal
 Slovakia
 Slovenia
 Spain
 Sweden
 Greenland
 Iceland
 Japan
 Liechtenstein
 New Zealand
 Norway
 San Marino
 South Korea
 Switzerland
 Taiwan
 United Kingdom
 United States

Saudi Arabia 
 Great Mosque of Makkah
 Masjid an-Nabawi

Sri Lanka
According to Air Navigation (Air Defence) Regulation 1 (2007), airspace over the territory and territorial waters of Sri Lanka (except Ruhuna Open Skies Area) are declared an air defence identification zone (ADIZ) with prohibited areas and restricted areas within it. No aircraft may operate in prohibited or restricted areas without valid air defence clearance (ADC) from the Sri Lanka Air Force (SLAF).

Prohibited areas are,
Colombo City  centering the Parliament – Sri Jayawardenapura Kotte
Sapugaskanda Oil Refinery
Orugodawatta Petroleum storage tanks.
Kolonnawa Petroleum storage complex

Restricted areas are,
Sri Lanka Air Force bases SLAF Anuradhapura, SLAF Hingurakgoda, SLAF Vavuniya, SLAF Palaly and SLAF Sigiriya
Jaffna town
Trincomalee harbour
SLAF China Bay
The garrison town of Diyatalawa
Temple of the Tooth, Kandy (earlier )

Taiwan
 The area around the Presidential Hall (總統府) and Taipei 101, both located in Taipei.
 Parts of the Taiwan Strait
 The area around the nuclear power plants in Taiwan.

Turkey
İmralı island

Ukraine
Since October 25, 2015 all traffic by Russian aircraft has been prohibited. As the result of the Russian invasion of Ukraine, the civilian flights flying over Ukraine and flights to the Ukrainian cities are suspended for the time being.

United Kingdom
Sellafield Nuclear Site, Cumbria
Winfrith nuclear research site
Atomic Energy Research Establishment Harwell has now been downgraded – see UK CAA
RNAD Coulport / HMNB Clyde Faslane
Dounreay Nuclear Power Development Establishment
Buckingham Palace
Windsor Castle
Houses of Parliament
Purple Corridor
Downing Street

United States
The FAA issues Temporary Flight Restrictions (TFR) in the form of a  Notice to Airmen (NOTAM) which are effective for the duration of an event, typically a few days or weeks.   TFRs are issued for VIP movement such as the president's travels outside Washington, D.C., surface-based hazards to flight such as toxic gas spills or volcanic eruptions, air-shows, military security, and special events including political ones like national party conventions. TFRs have also been issued to ensure a safe environment for firefighting operations in the case of wildfires and for other reasons as necessary.  A TFR was quickly issued around the crash site of Cory Lidle's airplane in New York City.  Later, a broader TFR was issued to require pilots traveling over the East River to obtain air traffic control clearance.

Permanent prohibited areas
Thurmont, Maryland, site of Presidential retreat Camp David (Prohibited Area 40 or P-40)
Amarillo, Texas, Pantex nuclear assembly plant (P-47)
Bush Ranch near Crawford, Texas (P-49)
Naval Submarine Base Kings Bay, Georgia (P-50)
Naval Base Kitsap, Washington (P-51)
Washington, D.C., U.S. Capitol, White House, and Naval Observatory (P-56); see Other restrictions below for information about all Active Prohibited Areas in the Washington D.C./Baltimore Flight Restricted Zone.
Bush compound near Kennebunkport, Maine (P-67)
Mount Vernon, Virginia, home of George Washington (P-73)
Boundary Waters Canoe Area Wilderness in northern Minnesota (P-204, 205, and 206)

Temporary restrictions over Disney theme parks were made permanent with language added to a 2003 federal spending bill.

TFAs over public and corporate venues have been controversial. Groups have questioned whether these last TFRs served a public need, or the needs of politically connected venue operators.

Other restrictions
In addition to areas off limits to civil aviation, a variety of other airspace restrictions exists in the United States. All pilots flying within the FRZ are required to undergo a background check and fingerprinting. An additional "Special Flight Rules Area" encompassing most of the Baltimore-Washington D.C. metropolitan area requires the filing of a flight plan and communication with air traffic control.

See also
 Air defense identification zone
 Controlled airspace
 Restricted airspace
 No-fly zone

References

External links
FAA Aeronautical Information Manual

Air traffic control